Another Man's War is a 2009 book written by Sam Childers about his life as a former gang biker turned preacher and defender of South Sudanese orphans.

The book was the basis of Machine Gun Preacher, a 2011 biographical adventure drama film starring Gerard Butler. 

The book bears the endorsement from South Sudan President Salva Kiir Mayardit, "The Reverend Sam Childers has been a very close friend to the government of South Sudan for many years and is a trusted friend."

References

External links
Goodreads

2009 American novels
English-language books
Books adapted into films
American autobiographical novels
Books about Africa